Centrepoint is a charity in the United Kingdom which provides accommodation and support to homeless people aged 16–25. The Prince of Wales has been a patron of the organization since 2005; his first patronage. His mother Diana, Princess of Wales, was patron of the organization before she died.

The charity's accommodation includes emergency nightshelters; short and long stay hostels; specialist projects for care leavers, ex-offenders and young single parents; foyers and supported flats; and floating support services.

History 

The charity was founded by the Anglo-Catholic socialist priest Kenneth Leech and set up its first shelter in a Soho church on 16 December 1969.

It was named Centrepoint in response to the building Centre Point being seen as an "affront to the homeless" for being left empty to make money for the property developer.

In 1986, a city broker, Richard Lester, on being asked for money for a cup of coffee by a homeless man, Martin Shaw, gave him £5,000. Shaw used this money to start Centrepoint's first dedicated hostel with over 100 beds. Centrepoint opened its first accommodation service outside London in Consett, County Durham, on 7 October 2005.

Diana, Princess of Wales, was formerly Centrepoint's patron and its current Patron is her son, the Prince of Wales.

Its ambassadors include the Radio 1 DJ Sara Cox, the fashion model Lady Kitty Spencer, the actress Lisa Maxwell, and the journalist and presenter Kirsty Young.

Activities 

Through its accommodation, Centrepoint provides approximately 1,200 bed spaces nationwide. Additional support services include a skills and employability team and a mental health team. Specialists within the skills and employability team help support young people back into education, training or employment, and the teaching of life skills.  Centrepoint also runs volunteering schemes, such as mentoring, which pairs a person with a young person for 12 months. It currently works with almost 100 mentors.

References

External links
Centrepoint

Homelessness charities in the United Kingdom
Charities based in London
Homelessness in the United Kingdom
1969 establishments in the United Kingdom
Organizations established in 1969
British Royal Family charities